Neil Austin is an English lighting designer. He has won two Olivier Awards and three Tony Awards and is the lighting designer for Harry Potter and the Cursed Child, for which he has won an Olivier, Tony, Drama Desk, Helpmann, Outer Critics Circle and WhatsOnStage Award.

Neil studied Technical Theatre at the Guildhall School of Music and Drama and was made a Fellow in 2008. Variety named him a Pacesetter on the London Arts Scene in 2007, and an Artisan Elite in 2019.

Awards 
2022: Dora Mavor Moore Awards for Outstanding Lighting Design - Harry Potter and the Cursed Child
2019: Tony Award for Best Lighting Design in a Play - Ink
2019: Knight of Illumination Award for Best Lighting Design (Musical Theatre) - Company
2019: Helpmann Award for Best Lighting Design - Harry Potter and the Cursed Child
2018: Tony Award for Best Lighting Design in a Play - Harry Potter and the Cursed Child
2018: Drama Desk Award for Outstanding Lighting Design for a Play - Harry Potter and the Cursed Child
2018: Outer Critics Circle Award for Outstanding Lighting Design - Harry Potter and the Cursed Child
2017: Laurence Olivier Award for Best Lighting Design - Harry Potter and the Cursed Child
2017: WhatsOnStage Award for Best Lighting Design - Harry Potter and the Cursed Child
2015: Falstaff Award for Best Lighting Design - The Winter's Tale
2013: Falstaff Award for Best Lighting Design - Macbeth
2012: Knight of Illumination Award for Best Lighting Design (Musical Theatre) - Company
2011: Laurence Olivier Award for Best Lighting Design - The White Guard
2010: Tony Award for Best Lighting Design in a Play - Red
2010: Drama Desk Award for Outstanding Lighting Design for a Play - Red
2010: LDI Award for Excellence in Lighting Design - Red & Hamlet
2010: Backstage Garland Award for Lighting Design - Parade
2008: Knight of Illumination Award for Best Lighting Design (Musical Theatre) - Parade

Nominations 
2023: WhatsOnStage Award for Best Lighting Design - Tammy Faye
2022: Dora Mavor Moore Awards for Outstanding Lighting Design - Harry Potter and the Cursed Child
2022: BroadwayWorld Award for Best Lighting Design of a New Play or Musical - The 47th
2022: Tony Award for Best Lighting Design in a Musical - Company
2022: Laurence Olivier Award for Best Lighting Design - Frozen
2022: WhatsOnStage Award for Best Lighting Design - Frozen
2020: Laurence Olivier Award for Best Lighting Design - Rosmersholm
2019: Tony Award for Best Lighting Design in a Play - Ink
2019: Laurence Olivier Award for Best Lighting Design - Company
2019: Knight of Illumination Award (USA) for Best Lighting Design (Play - Large Venue) - Ink
2019: Knight of Illumination Award for Best Lighting Design (Musical Theatre) - Company
2019: WhatsOnStage Award for Best Lighting Design - Company
2019: Helpmann Award for Best Lighting Design - Harry Potter and the Cursed Child
2019: BroadwayWorld Award for Best Lighting Design of a New Play or Musical - Rosmersholm
2018: Tony Award for Best Lighting Design in a Play - Harry Potter and the Cursed Child
2018: Drama Desk Award for Outstanding Lighting Design for a Play - Harry Potter and the Cursed Child
2018: Outer Critics Circle Award for Outstanding Lighting Design - Harry Potter and the Cursed Child
2018: Broadway World UK Awards - Best Lighting Design of a New Production of a Play or Musical - Translations
2017: Laurence Olivier Award for Best Lighting Design - Harry Potter and the Cursed Child
2017: WhatsOnStage Award for Best Lighting Design - Harry Potter and the Cursed Child
2016: Laurence Olivier Award for Best Lighting Design - The Winter's Tale
2016: Drama Desk Award for Outstanding Lighting Design for a Play - Hughie
2015: Knight of Illumination Award for Best Lighting Design (Musical Theatre) - Assassins
2015: Falstaff Award for Best Lighting Design - The Winter's Tale
2013: Manchester Theatre Award for Best Design - Macbeth
2013: Falstaff Award for Best Lighting Design - Macbeth
2012: Drama Desk Award for Outstanding Lighting Design for a Play - Evita
2012: Outer Critics Circle Award for Outstanding Lighting Design - Evita
2012: Knight of Illumination Award for Best Lighting Design (Musical Theatre) - Company
2012: WhatsOnStage Award for Best Lighting Design - Betty Blue Eyes
2011: Laurence Olivier Award for Best Lighting Design - The White Guard
2011: Knight of Illumination Award for Best Lighting Design (Musical Theatre) - Passion
2011: WhatsOnStage Award for Best Lighting Design - The Prince of Homburg
2011: WhatsOnStage Award for Best Lighting Design - Women Beware Women
2010: Tony Award for Best Lighting Design in a Play - Hamlet
2010: Tony Award for Best Lighting Design in a Play - Red
2010: Drama Desk Award for Outstanding Lighting Design for a Play - Hamlet
2010: Drama Desk Award for Outstanding Lighting Design for a Play - Red
2010: Knight of Illumination Award for Best Lighting Design (Play) - Judgement Day
2010: WhatsOnStage Award for Best Lighting Design - Madame de Sade
2010: WhatsOnStage Award for Best Lighting Design - Life is a Dream
2010: LA Stage Alliance Ovation Awards - Parade
2010: LDI Award for Excellence in Lighting Design - Red
2010: LDI Award for Excellence in Lighting Design - Hamlet
2010: Backstage Garland Award for Lighting Design - Parade
2009: Laurence Olivier Award for Best Lighting Design - Piaf
2009: Laurence Olivier Award for Best Lighting Design - No Man's Land
2009: Knight of Illumination Award for Best Lighting Design (Play) - Twelfth Night
2009: Knight of Illumination Award for Best Lighting Design (Musical Theatre) - Piaf
2009: WhatsOnStage Award for Best Lighting Design - Oedipus
2009: WhatsOnStage Award for Best Lighting Design - Piaf
2009: WhatsOnStage Award for Best Lighting Design - Life is a Dream
2009: Irish Times Theatre Award for Best Lighting Designer - No Man's Land
2012: Knight of Illumination Award for Best Lighting Design (Musical Theatre) - Parade
2007: Laurence Olivier Award for Best Lighting Design - Therese Raquin
2007: Outer Critics Circle Award for Outstanding Lighting Design - Frost/Nixon

References

Lighting designers
Laurence Olivier Award winners
Tony Award winners
Drama Desk Award winners
Living people
Year of birth missing (living people)
Place of birth missing (living people)